Nodari is an Italian surname. Notable people with the surname include:

Alex Nodari (born 1982), Italian footballer
Matteo Nodari (born 1991), Italian footballer
Vindizio Nodari Pesenti (1879–1961), Italian painter

See also
Nodar

Italian-language surnames